The Takoma Park Presbyterian Church is a Presbyterian Church located in Takoma Park, Maryland.  The church was founded in 1888 as the Union Chapel.

References

External links

Presbyterian churches in Maryland
Buildings and structures in Takoma Park, Maryland
Churches in Montgomery County, Maryland